Richardson Ridge is a cold water coral reef in the Atlantic Ocean about 160 miles off the coast of Charleston, South Carolina and a half mile below the ocean's surface. Based on sonar mapping, it is estimated that the reef extends for at least 85 linear miles.

Discovery
The ridge was discovered in the summer of 2018 by a team led by Erik Cordes, a deep-sea ecologist and professor from Temple University.

References

Reefs of the Atlantic Ocean